Norma Cantu or Norma Cantú may refer to:

Norma Elia Cantú (born 1947), Chicana postmodernist writer and professor
Norma V. Cantú (born 1954), American civil rights lawyer and educator